Lanthanum gallium silicate (referred to as LGS in this article), also known as langasite, has a chemical formula of the form A3BC3D2O14, where A, B, C and D indicate particular cation sites. A is a decahedral (Thomson cube) site coordinated by 8 oxygen atoms. B is octahedral site coordinated by 6 oxygen atoms, and C and D are tetrahedral sites coordinated by 4 oxygen atoms. In this material, lanthanum occupied the A-sites, gallium the B, C and half of D-sites, and, silicon the other half of D-sites.

LGS is a piezoelectric material, with no phase transitions up to its melting point of 1470 °C. Single crystal LGS can be grown via the Czochralski method, in which crystallization is initiated on a rotating seed crystal lowered into the melt followed by pulling from the melt. The growth atmosphere is usually argon or nitrogen with up to 5% of oxygen. The use of oxygen in the growth environment is reported to suppress gallium loss from the melt; however, too high an oxygen level can lead to platinum (crucible material used for the melt) dissolution in the melt. The growth of LGS is primarily along the z direction. Currently the 3-inch (76 mm) langasite boules produced commercially have growth rates of 1.5 to 5 mm/h. The quality of the crystals tends to improve as the growth rate is reduced.

See also
Ceramic
lanthanum gallium tantalum oxide, langatite (CAS RN 83381-05-9) La6Ga11TaO28 (i.e., La3Ga5.5Ta00.5O14)

References

External links
Properties of a langasite crystal

Lanthanum compounds
Gallium compounds
Silicates
Piezoelectric materials
Ceramic materials